Nenmini  is a small village in Malappuram district in the state of Kerala, India.

Demographics
 India census, Nenmini had a population of 14815 with 7151 males and 7664 females.

Nenmini is situated in Perinthalmanna Taluk and located in Keezhattur village of Malappuram district.

Languages
Like in other parts of Kerala, Malayalam is the spoken language in Nenmini Village

Transportation
Nenmini village connects Manjeri town and Pandikkad to Perinthalmanna town.

References

Villages in Malappuram district
Perinthalmanna area